Mossy Oak is a West Point, Mississippi–based branded camouflage and outdoor lifestyle company founded by Toxey Haas in 1986. Mossy Oak is owned and operated by its parent company Haas Outdoors, Inc.

History 
Haas, an avid outdoorsman, gained inspiration from the natural twigs, leaves, and dirt in the woods. He named it Mossy Oak, gathered up a handful and decided to find someone who could print a fabric resembling this. Crystal Springs Print Works in Georgia printed his first pattern, making an exception to their usual 10,000 yard fabric minimum, as Haas only had enough money for 800 yards.

In 2000, the apparel operations for Haas Outdoors, Inc. were acquired by the Russell Brands for an undisclosed amount. This became known as the Mossy Oak Apparel Company.

BioLogic 
Haas, along with wildlife biologist Grant Woods, cofounded BioLogic in 1999. Woods spent years researching the feeding habits of wildlife, including visits with research scientists and deer farmers in New Zealand studying their production methods.

Nativ Nurseries 
Founded in 2007, Mossy Oak Nativ Nurseries is headquartered in West Point and grows and sells trees for landowners.

Gamekeeper Kennels 
Mossy Oak Gamekeeper Kennels breeds and trains labrador retriever in West Point, MS. Bill Gibson is the Director of Gun Dog Operations.

References

External links 
 

1986 establishments in Mississippi
Clothing companies of the United States
Companies based in West Point, Mississippi
Companies established in 1986
Outdoor clothing brands
Privately held companies based in Mississippi
Retail companies of the United States